Ahmed Zaki Badr is a former Minister of Education for Egypt.

Early life and education
Badr is the son of the former minister of interior in Egypt, Zaki Badr. He received his bachelor of science degree in engineering from Ain Shams University in 1982. He then obtained master of science degree again from Ain Shams University in 1986. He also received his PhD from University of Nantes, France in 1990.

Career
Badr was appointed minister of education on 3 January 2010. His appointment was not welcomed by the Muslim Brotherhood. During his term, his activities led to protests. Badr was replaced by Ahmed El Din in 2011. At the end of 2011 he began to serve as the president of the Akhbar El Youm Academy.

References

 

Living people
Ain Shams University alumni
University of Nantes alumni
Education Ministers of Egypt
Year of birth missing (living people)